Papallacta is a small village at an altitude of  in Napo Province, Ecuador. The village is located off the Eastern Cordilleras, on the road from Quito into the Amazon rainforest. It is known for its hot springs.

How to reach 
The drive from Quito to Papallacta passes through several towns and villages before ascending to a pass at an elevation of over 4,000 meters. From here, mountains and glaciers are visible. Descending from the high altitude pass to Papallacta, the ecosystem shifts from alpine to tropical forests. Several hot springs are located in Papallacta. 

Lake Papallacta and its surrounding watershed previously provided much of the drinking water for Quito. This changed in 2003 after landslides in the region. The close proximity of the water pipeline from the lake and oil pipelines from the Amazon rainforests led to water contamination after oil leak. The contamination affected Papallacta's use of the lake as a source of clean water.

See also
List of highest towns by country

References

Populated places in Napo Province